Pilophorus cinnamopterus is a species of true bug in the Miridae family that can be found everywhere in Europe (except for Albania, Azores, Canary Islands, Cyprus, Faroe Islands, Iceland, Lithuania, Moldova, Madeira, Novaya Zemlya, Portugal and in the states of former Yugoslavia except Slovenia and Croatia). Further East across the Palearctic it is found in Asia minor and the Caspian region then to Eastern Siberia.

Description
Unlike Pilophorus perplexus their forewings are orange-brown coloured. The species feed on aphids.

References

External links
Pilophorus cinnamopterus on Flickr
Pilophorus cinnamopterus on Krognet.net

cinnamopterus
Beetles of Europe
Beetles described in 1856